Aligarh Muslim University (abbreviated as AMU) is a public central university in Aligarh, Uttar Pradesh, India, which was originally established by Sir Syed Ahmad Khan as the Muhammadan Anglo-Oriental College in 1875. Muhammadan Anglo-Oriental College became Aligarh Muslim University in 1920, following the Aligarh Muslim University Act. It has three off-campus centres in AMU Malappuram Campus (Kerala), AMU Murshidabad Centre (West Bengal), and Kishanganj Centre (Bihar).
The university offers more than 300 courses in traditional and modern branches of education, and is an institute of national importance as declared under seventh schedule of the Constitution of India at its commencement.

History

Funding 
The university was established as the Muhammadan Anglo-Oriental College in 1875 by Sir Syed Ahmad Khan, starting functioning on 24 May 1875. The movement associated with Syed Ahmad Khan and the college came to be known as the Aligarh Movement, which pushed to realise the need for establishing a modern education system for the Indian Muslim populace. He considered competence in English and Western sciences necessary skills for maintaining Muslims' political influence. Khan's vision for the college was based on his visit to Oxford University and Cambridge University, and he wanted to establish an education system similar to the British model.

A committee was formed by the name of foundation of Muslim College and asked people to fund generously. Then Viceroy and Governor General of India, Thomas Baring gave a donation of 10,000 while the Lt. Governor of the North Western Provinces contributed 1,000, and by March 1874 funds for the college stood at 1,53,920 and 8 annas. Maharao Raja Mahamdar Singh Mahamder Bahadur of Patiala contributed 58,000 while Raja Shambhu Narayan of Benaras donated 60,000. Donations also came in from the Maharaja of Vizianagaram as well. The college was initially affiliated to the University of Calcutta for the matriculate examination but became an affiliate of Allahabad University in 1885.
 The seventh Nizam of Hyderabad, HEH Mir Osman Ali Khan made a remarkable donation of 5,00,000 to this institution in the year 1918.

Establishment as university 

Circa 1900, Muslim University Association was formed to spearhead efforts to transform the college into a university. The Government of India informed the association that a sum of rupees thirty lakhs should be collected to establish the university. Therefore, a Muslim University Foundation Committee was started and it collected the necessary funds. The contributions were made by Muslims as well as non-Muslims. Mohammad Ali Mohammad Khan and Aga Khan III had helped in realising the idea by collecting funds for building the Aligarh Muslim University. With the MAO College as a nucleus, the Aligarh Muslim University was then established by the Aligarh Muslim University Act, 1920. In 1927, the Ahmadi School for the Visually Challenged, Aligarh Muslim University was established and in the following year, a medical school was attached to the university. The college of unani medicine, Ajmal Khan Tibbya College was established in 1927 with the Ajmal Khan Tibbiya College Hospital being established later in 1932. The Jawaharlal Nehru Medical College And Hospital was established later in 1962 as a part of the university. In 1935, the Zakir Husain College of Engineering and Technology was also established as a constituent of the university.

Before 1939, faculty members and students supported an all-India nationalist movement but after 1939, political sentiment shifted towards support for a Muslim separatist movement. Students and faculty members supported Muhammad Ali Jinnah and the university came to be a center of the Pakistan Movement.

Women's education
Dr. Sheikh Abdullah ("Papa Mian") is the founder of the women's college of Aligarh Muslim University and had pressed for women's education, writing articles while also publishing a monthly women's magazine, Khatoon. To start the college for women, he had led a delegation to the Lt. Governor of the United Provinces while also writing a proposal to Sultan Jahan, Begum of Bhopal. Begum Jahan had allocated a grant of  100 per month for the education of women. On 19 October 1906, he successfully started a school for girls with five students and one teacher at a rented property in Aligarh. The foundation stone for the girls' hostel was laid by him and his wife, Waheed Jahan Begum ("Ala Bi") after struggles on 7 November 1911. Later, a high school was established in 1921, gaining the status of an intermediate college in 1922, finally becoming a constituent of the Aligarh Muslim University as an undergraduate college in 1937. Later, Dr. Abdullah's daughters also served as principals of the women's college. One of his daughters was Mumtaz Jahan Haider, during whose tenure as principal, Maulana Abdul Kalam Azad had visited the university and offered a grant of 9,00,000. She was involved in the establishment of the Women's College, organised various extracurricular events, and reasserted the importance of education for Muslim women.

The professional courses are run with co-educational system. Girls students are accommodated in well established six Halls of residence where they have all facilities of living and studies. The Hostels inside these Halls are equipped with reading rooms, common rooms, sports facilities, dinning Hall etc.

Minority institution status 
Aligarh Muslim University is considered to be an institution of national importance, under the seventh schedule of the Constitution of India. In 1967, a constitution bench of the Supreme Court had held that the university is not a minority educational institution protected under the Indian constitution; the verdict had been given in case to which the university was not a party. In 1981, an amendment was made to the Aligarh Muslim University Act, following which in 2006 the Allahabad High Court struck down the provision of the act which accorded the university minority educational institution status. In April 2016, the Indian government stated that it would not appeal against the decision. In February 2019, the issue was referred by the Supreme Court of India to a constitution bench of seven judges.

Campus

The campus of Aligarh Muslim University is spread over 467.6 hectares in the city of Aligarh, Uttar Pradesh. The nearest railways station is the Aligarh Junction.  It is a residential university with most of the staff and students residing on the campus. There are 19 halls of residence for students (13 for boys and 6 for girls) with 80 hostels.  The Halls are administered by a Provost and a number of teacher wardens who look after different hostels. Each Hall maintains a Dining Hall, a Common Room with facilities for indoor games, a Reading Room, Library, Sports Clubs and a Literary. The Halls are named after people associated with the Aligarh Movement and the university.

Sir Syed Hall is the oldest Hall of the university. It houses many heritage buildings such as Strachey Hall, Mushtaq Manzil, Asman Manzil, Nizam Museum and Lytton Library, Victoria Gate, and Jama Masjid.

The campus also maintains a cricket ground, Willingdon Pavilion, a synthetic hockey ground and a park, Gulastan-e-Syed.

Other notable buildings in the campus includes the Maulana Azad Library, Moinuddin Ahmad Art Gallery, Kennedy Auditorium, Musa Dakri Museum, the Cultural Education Centre, Siddons Debating Union Hall and Sir Syed House.

The main university gate is called Bab-e-Syed. In 2020 a new gate called Centenary Gate was built to celebrate the centenary year of the university.

Organisation and administration

Governance
The university's formal head is the chancellor, though this is a titular figure, and is not involved with the day-to-day running of the university. The chancellor is elected by the members of the University Court. The university's chief executive is the vice-chancellor, appointed by the President of India on the recommendation of the court. The court is the supreme governing body of the university and exercises all the powers of the university, not otherwise provided for by the Aligarh Muslim University Act, and the statutes, ordinances and regulations of the university.

In 2018, Mufaddal Saifuddin was elected chancellor and Ibne Saeed Khan, the former Nawab of Chhatari was elected the pro-Chancellor. Syed Zillur Rahman was elected honorary treasurer. On 17 May 2017, Tariq Mansoor assumed office as the 39th vice-chancellor of the university.

Faculties

Aligarh Muslim University's academic departments are divided into 13 faculties.

 Faculty of Agricultural Sciences
 Faculty of Arts
 Faculty of Commerce
 Faculty of Engineering & Technology
 Faculty of Law
 Faculty of Life Sciences
 Faculty of Medicine
 Faculty of Management Studies & Research
 Faculty of Science
 Faculty of Social Sciences
 Faculty of Theology
 Faculty of International Studies
 Faculty of Unani Medicine

Colleges
Aligarh Muslim University maintains 7 colleges.

 Women's College
 Zakir Hussain College of Engineering & Technology
 Ajmal Khan Tibbiya College
 Jawaharlal Nehru Medical College
 Dr. Ziauddin Ahmad Dental College
 Community College
 Academic Staff College

In addition the university also maintains 15 Centres, 3 Institutes, 10 schools including Minto Circle and the Ahmadi School for the Visually Challenged The university's Faculty of Theology has two departments, one for the Shi'a school of thought and another for the Sunni school of thought.

Aligarh Muslim University has established three centres at Malappuram (Kerala; the AMU Malappuram Campus), Murshidabad (West Bengal) and Kishanganj (Bihar), while a site has been identified for Aurangabad, (Maharashtra) centre.

Academics

Courses
Aligarh Musilim University offers over 300 degrees and is organised around 12 faculties offering courses in a range of technical and vocational subjects, as well as interdisciplinary subjects. In 2011, it opened two new centres in West Bengal and Kerala for the study of MBAs and Integrated Law.
The university has around 28,000 students and a faculty of almost 1,500 teaching staff. Students are drawn from all states in India and several different countries, with most of its international students coming from Africa, West Asia and Southeast Asia. Admission into the university is entrance based.

Rankings 

Internationally, AMU was ranked 1001–1200 in the QS World University Rankings of 2023 and 271–280 in Asia. It was ranked 801–1000 in the world by the Times Higher Education World University Rankings of 2023, 201–250 in Asia in 2022 and 251–300 among emerging economies. AMU was also ranked 901–1000 in the Academic Ranking of World Universities of 2022.

In India, AMU was ranked 18 overall by the National Institutional Ranking Framework (NIRF) in 2020 and tenth among universities.

Among government engineering colleges, the Zakir Hussain College of Engineering and Technology, the engineering college of the university, was ranked 32 by India Today in 2020 and 35 by the National Institutional Ranking Framework among engineering colleges in 2020.

The Jawaharlal Nehru Medical College, the medical school of the university, has been ranked 19th by India Today in 2020.

Libraries 

The Maulana Azad Library is the primary library of the university, consisting of a central library and over 100 departmental and college libraries. It houses royal decrees of Mughal emperors such as Babur, Akbar and Shah Jahan. The foundation of the library was laid in 1877 at the time of establishment of the Mohammedan Anglo-Oriental College by Robert Bulwer-Lytton, 1st Earl of Lytton, then viceroy of India and it was named after him as Lytton Library. The present seven-storied building was inaugurated by Jawaharlal Nehru, the first prime Minister of independent India, in 1960 and the library was named after Abul Kalam Azad, popularly known as Maulana Azad, the first education minister of the independent India.

The social science cyber library was inaugurated by Pranab Mukherjee, then President of India, on 27 December 2013. In 2015, it was accredited with the International Organization for Standardization certification.

Student life

Traditions 
Sherwani is worn by male students of the university and is a traditional attire of the university. It is required to be worn during official programs The university provides sherwanis at a subsidized price. In early 2013, Zameer Uddin Shah, the then Vice Chancellor of the university, insisted that male students have to wear sherwani if they wanted to meet him.

The AMU Tarana or anthem was composed by poet and university student Majaz. It is an abridged version of Majaz's 1933 poem "Narz-e-Aligarh". In 1955, Khan Ishtiaq Mohammad, a university student, composed the song and it was adopted as the official anthem of the university. The song is played during every function at the university along with the National Anthem.

Students' Union 

Aligarh Muslim University Students' Union (AMUSU) is the university-wide representative body for students at the university. It is an elected body.

Clubs and societies
The university has sports and cultural clubs functioning under its aegis. The Siddons Union Club is the debating club of the university. It was established in the year 1884 and was named after Henry George Impey Siddons, the first principal of the MAO college. It has hosted politicians, writers, Nobel laureates, players, and journalists, including the Dalai Lama, Mahatma Gandhi, Abul Kalam Azad, Jawahar Lal Nehru. Sporting clubs include the Cricket Club, Aligarh Muslim University and the Muslim University Riding Club.

The Raleigh Literary Society of the university hosts competitive events, plays, and performances, including performances of Shakespeare's plays. The society is named after Shakespeare critic Sir Walter Raleigh, who had served as the English professor at the Mohammedan Anglo-Oriental College from 1885 to 1887.

The Law Society of the university was founded in 1894 as a non-profit student organization. The society publishes law reviews and organizes events, both academic and social, from annual fest to freshers social and farewell party for final year students.

AMU Journal

AMU Journal is an independent student and alumni-run educational community and media organization, it was started in the year 2016 by a group of AMU Students to raise campus issues and to provide News and information about Happening Events inside the university but later it became an educational community. On 17 October 2021 AMU Journal website was re-launched by Public relations officer, Proctor and Deputy Proctor, Aligarh Muslim University in collaboration with the Training and Placement Office, AMU.

Cultural festivals
Every year the various clubs of the university organize their own cultural festivals. Two notable fests are the University Film Club's Filmsaaz and the Literary Club's AMU Literary Festival.

Old Boys' Association 
Old Boys' Association is the alumni network of the university. It was established in the year 1898 and has been statutory recognition under AMU, Act 1920.

AMU Campuses
AMU Malappuram Campus Kerala
Aligarh Muslim University: Murshidabad Centre West Bengal
AMU Kishanganj Centre, Bihar

Notable alumni and faculty 

Following is a list of alumni from the university.
Alumni from the field of literature and cinema include – Hakim Ahmad Shuja, Saadat Hasan Manto, Khwaja Ahmad Abbas, Syed Mujtaba Ali, Anubhav Sinha, NaseerUddin Shah, Hasrat Mohani, Ahmed Ali and Wadeh Rashid Hasani Nadwi.
Alumni from the field of politics include – Sir Sikandar Hayat Khan KBE, first Muslim Premier of the Punjab; Maulvi Syed Tufail Ahmad Manglori, Indian independence activist and historian; Sir Khwaja Nazimuddin, second governor-general and second prime minister of Pakistan; Ayub Khan, second president of Pakistan; Malik Ghulam Mohammad, First finance minister of Pakistan and Governor General of Pakistan (1951–56) he was co-owner of Mahindra and Mohammed, now called Mahindra & Mahindra, Shri Liaqat Ali Khan, First Prime Minister of Pakistan, Mohamed Amin Didi, first president of Maldives; Muhammad Ataul Goni Osmani, Commander-in-chief of Bangladesh Forces during the 1971 Bangladesh War of Independence; Muhammad Mansur Ali, third prime minister of Bangladesh; Zakir Husain, third president of India; Khan Abdul Ghaffar Khan, an Indian independence activist; Mohammad Hamid Ansari, twelfth vice-president of India; Arif Mohammad Khan, twenty-second governor of Kerala; Anwara Taimur the first and yet only female chief minister of the Indian state of Assam; Sheikh Abdullah and Mufti Mohammad Sayeed, respectively third and sixth chief minister of the Indian state of Jammu and Kashmir; and Sahib Singh Verma, fourth chief minister of the Indian union territory of Delhi.
Alumni from the field of law include – Justice Baharul Islam, Justice Ram Prakash Sethi, Justice Saiyed Saghir Ahmad, Justice Syed Murtaza Fazl Ali (all judges of Supreme Court of India), Haji Farah Omar, N. R. Madhava Menon & Faizan Mustafa.
Alumni from the field of science include – Professor Bushra Ateeq.
Alumni from the field of sports include – Dhyan Chand, Lala Amarnath and Zafar Iqbal and Iranian footballers Majid Bishkar and Jamshid Nassiri.
Alumni from the field of business and entrepreneurship include - Frank F Islam.
Other notable alumni include – Indian historian Mohammad Habib, French mathematician André Weil, and Malik Ghulam Muhammad, the co-founder of Mahindra & Mahindra.
Yasin Mazhar Siddiqi Muslim scholar and historian who served as director of the Institute of Islamic Studies
Bijan Abdolkarimi Iranian philosopher
Naseem uz Zafar Baquiri Medical Practitioner, Poet
Tika Lal Taploo Lawyer

In popular culture 
The 1963 film Mere Mehboob, directed by H. S. Rawail starring Rajendra Kumar, Sadhana, Ashok Kumar was shot on the campus.
The 1966 film Nai Umar Ki Nai Fasal was also filmed on the campus.
The 2015 film, Aligarh portrays the struggles faced by Ramchandra Siras, a homosexual professor from the university.

Further reading

References

External links 

 
AMU Controller of Exam for admission

 
Educational institutions established in 1875
Central universities in Uttar Pradesh
Islamic universities and colleges in India
Pakistan Movement
1875 establishments in British India
Universities and colleges in Aligarh
Aligarh Movement